An invention is a unique or novel device, method, composition or process.

Invention or invented may also refer to:

Invention (musical composition), a short composition (usually for a keyboard instrument) with two-part counterpoint
Invention (album), a 1997 collaboration by Phil Keaggy, Wes King, and Scott Dente
Invention (Ligeti), a 1948 piano composition by György Ligeti
Inventions (album), a 1965 album by Sandy Bull
Inventions (band), a musical group composed of members of the ensembles Eluvium and Explosions in the Sky
Invented (album), a 2010 album by Jimmy Eat World
Inventio, the method used for the discovery of arguments in Western rhetoric
"Invention", a song by Pedro the Lion from the 1999 EP The Only Reason I Feel Secure

See also 
 
 Inventor (disambiguation)
 Inventive step, a requirement in patent law